HMS Melampus was an  protected cruiser of the Royal Navy which served from 1890 to 1910.

History

In 1890, building by the Naval Construction and Armaments Co, later known as Vickers, commenced. Melampus was originally ordered and built for the Greek navy.

In 1891, when Prince George of Wales (the future King George V) was promoted to commander, he assumed command of Melampus. He relinquished his post in January 1892, on the death of his brother Prince Albert Victor, Duke of Clarence and Avondale.

On 5 July 1892, in Portsmouth, Melampus carried out trials of her machinery and other equipment, following which she swung her compasses at Spithead. She later departed on 7 July for Plymouth and Falmouth.

On 26 June 1897, she was present at the Naval Review at Spithead in celebration of the Diamond Jubilee.

On 16 January 1901, she accidentally grounded .

In 1903 Melampus was withdrawn as guard ship at Kingstown in Ireland.

On 12 July 1910, Melampus was sold for scrap for £9,000.

References

Publications

External links
 HMS Melampus , Index of 19th-century naval vessels
 HMS Melampus' Profile at Battleships-Cruisers.co.uk

 

Apollo-class cruisers
Ships built in Barrow-in-Furness
1890 ships
World War I cruisers of the United Kingdom